Crocus is an unincorporated community in Adair and Russell counties in the U.S. state of Kentucky.  Its elevation is 988 feet (301 m).

The community, first established in 1840, possibly received its name from the wild crocuses growing along the nearby creek.

References

Unincorporated communities in Adair County, Kentucky
Unincorporated communities in Russell County, Kentucky
Unincorporated communities in Kentucky